The Harthausen Forest is a large forested area that – depending on the definition used – is 20 to over 30 km² in area. The largest part of the forest lies on the territory of Hardthausen am Kocher and thus in the county of Heilbronn, a smaller part in the east is in Hohenlohekreis.

The forest derives its name from the settlement Harthausen near Lampoldshausen which was abandoned in the Late Middle Ages.

Location 
The Harthausen Forest lies between the lower courses of the Jagst and Kocher. The towns and villages of Möckmühl, Widdern, Jagsthausen, Öhringen, Hardthausen am Kocher, Neuenstadt am Kocher and Neudenau (in clockwise order) have shares in the forest region. Apart from Öhringen, which belongs to Hohenlohekreis, all of them are in the county of Heilbronn. 80% of the forest is in the municipality of Hardthausen am Kocher. In the north the forest reaches the River Jagst between Züttlingen and Olnhausen at several places. In the southeast it reaches the Kocher between Sindringen and Ohrnberg.

These maximum heights are attained on the Landesstraße L 1047 between its bridge over the motorway and the Seehaus. This ridge forms the watershed in the forest between the nearby Jagst to the north and the Kocher to the south, much further away.

References

Literature 
 Hans Mattern: Auf Naturschutzfahrten im nördlichen Württemberg (1 und 2). In: Landesanstalt für Umweltschutz Baden-Württemberg (Hrsg.): Veröffentlichungen für Naturschutz und Landschaftspflege in Baden-Württemberg. Band 67, 1992, S. 49-96  (den Harthäuser Wald betreffend S. 64–65)
 Der Harthäuser Wald. In: Hardthausen in Geschichte(n) in Hardthausen. Gemeinde Hardthausen, Hardthausen am Kocher 1997. S. 193–217

External links 
 Dokumentation "Die Hohe Straße zwischen Kocher und Jagst – Durch den Harthäuser Wald"
 Website der Schutzgemeinschaft Harthäuser Wald e.V. (hervorgegangen aus der Bürgerinitiative RetteDeinenWald, die gegen die Errichtung von Windenergieanlagen im Harthäuser Wald agierte)

Forests and woodlands of Baden-Württemberg
Heilbronn (district)
Hohenlohe (district)